The Iranian company known as Mado specializes in aircraft propulsion systems.

The managing director of the Mado company, Yousef Aboutaleni, was sanctioned by the United States in 2021 for his role in the MT Mercer Street bombing. The company's ownership list includes IRGC Brigadier General Abdollah Mehrabi.

Sanctions
On 29 October 2021 the US added to its Specially Designated Nationals and Blocked Persons List both Aboutaleni and Mehrabi as well as Mado.

At the same time, Mehrabi was designated pursuant to E.O. 13382 for acting or purporting to act for or on behalf of, directly or indirectly, the IRGC ASF SSJO.

Products
A non-exhaustive list, obtained from a 2014 trade fair, follows:
Mado MD26 1-cylinder 2-cycle engine
Mado MD275 2-cylinder, horizontally opposed 2-cycle engine
Mado MD550: a 4-cylinder, horizontally opposed 2-cycle engine
MADO Wankel-type single-rotor engine similar in appearance to Chinese BMP MDR-208
at least 8 types of wooden propellers

References

Aerospace companies of Iran
Aircraft engine manufacturers of Iran
Iranian brands
Qom
Defence companies of Iran
Manufacturing companies of Iran
Iranian entities subject to the U.S. Department of the Treasury sanctions